Neil Ternovatsky (born October 15, 1984) is a former Canadian football linebacker. He was signed by the Edmonton Eskimos as an undrafted free agent in 2006. He played CIS football for the Alberta Golden Bears. Ternovatsky was also a member of the Calgary Stampeders and Winnipeg Blue Bombers. He is the only Tupper Cup alumni to ever make it to the CFL.

External links
Calgary Stampeders bio

1984 births
Living people
Alberta Golden Bears football players
Canadian football linebackers
Calgary Stampeders players
Edmonton Elks players
Players of Canadian football from Manitoba
Canadian football people from Winnipeg
Winnipeg Blue Bombers players